The Fritz John conditions (abbr. FJ conditions), in mathematics, are a necessary condition for a solution in nonlinear programming to be optimal. They are used as lemma in the proof of the Karush–Kuhn–Tucker conditions, but they are relevant on their own.

We consider the following optimization problem:

Named after Fritz John, these conditions are equivalent to the Karush–Kuhn–Tucker conditions in the case . When , the condition is equivalent to the violation of Mangasarian–Fromovitz constraint qualification (MFCQ). In other words, the Fritz John condition is equivalent to the optimality condition KKT or not-MFCQ.

References

Further reading

Mathematical optimization